Saenkhan Football Club (Thaiสโมสรฟุตบอลแสนขัน เอฟซี), is a Thai football club based in Uttaradit province, Thailand. The club is currently playing in the Thai Football Division 3.

Record

References
 104 ทีมร่วมชิงชัย! แบโผผลจับสลาก ดิวิชั่น 3 ฤดูกาล 2016

External links
 Facebookpage

Association football clubs established in 2009
Football clubs in Thailand
Sport in Uttaradit province
2009 establishments in Thailand